The Gujarat football team is an Indian football team representing Gujarat in Indian state football competitions including the Santosh Trophy. The team is currently governed by Gujarat State Football Association.

Team 
The following 22 players were called up prior to the 2022–23 Santosh Trophy

References

Santosh Trophy teams
Football in Gujarat
Year of establishment missing